The Vermont State Fair is an annual state fair held in Rutland, Vermont at the Vermont State Fairgrounds. In the past, the event had taken place in early September, and lasted 9 to 10 days. In 2016, the dates were changed to a mid-August festival, with the first August fair taking place on the 16th thru 20th.

History 
The Vermont State Fair is an agricultural fair managed by The Rutland County Agricultural Society.

The first Vermont State Fair took place in 1846, making this one of the oldest state fairs in the United States. Originally named the Rutland State Fair, the event started out as a one-day event. The first fair took place in a field near Castleton, with Fredrick Button as the first President of the Rutland County Agricultural Society.

The fair became popular enough that, in 1849, the Rutland Railroad began putting extra cars on their trains to bring people from all over Vermont and Western New York to visit. After moving around Rutland County for a few years, the Rutland Fair grew closer to Rutland City, sometimes setting up on land owned by John Cain (now Grove Street, north of Crescent) or on the old Baxter Estate.

The fair was given a permanent home in 1856. The land at 175 South Main Street in Rutland, VT was originally known as the Rutland County Park. The fair, officially renamed the "Vermont State Fair" in 1972, is still held at this location today.

There was no fair held between 1917 and 1918 because of World War I, 1942–45 because of World War II, and 2020 because of the ongoing COVID-19 pandemic.

Midway 

The Midway rides are currently being supplied annually by Amusements of America. Past suppliers have included Family Fun Amusements!, Coleman Brothers Shows, Castlerock Shows, Silver Dollar Shows And World of Mirth Shows.

Dining

Roxie's 
Roxie's Famous French Fries, or Roxie's is a restaurant located within the fairgrounds. The restaurant is known not only for its french fries, but also for its foot-long hotdogs, and is a popular place to eat amongst fairgoers. Roxie's operates throughout the warmer months of the year, regardless of whether the fair is taking place.

MSJ Green Wave Cafe 

The MSJ Green Wave Cafe is a locally run food stand at the Vermont State Fair. The booth is run by many alumni and volunteers to the Mount Saint Joseph (MSJ) Academy in Rutland, Vermont. The booth sells such food as hamburgers, sausages, and many different Pepsi and Coca-Cola products.

Other dining 
Other food joints in the fair are popular for selling pizza, Italian sausages, soft drinks, fried dough, corn dogs, candy apples, cotton candy, popcorn, various fried foods and other popular fair food items.

Admission
2023 Vermont State Fair Admission Prices

 Adults (Ages 12 and older) = $5-12
 Children (Ages 6–11) = up to $5
 Children (Ages 5 and under) = FREE

Hours 
 
1940s Vermont State Fair Hours

 August 16 ~ 5:00pm to Midnight
 August 17 ~ 8:00am to 11:00pm
 August 18 ~ 8:00am to 11:00pm
 August 19 ~ 8:00am to Midnight
 August 20 ~ 8:00am to Midnight

Gallery

See also 
State fair
Vermont State Fairgrounds
List of festivals in the United States

References

External links 
 

 

State fairs
Festivals in Vermont
Rutland, Vermont
Buildings and structures in Rutland County, Vermont
Tourist attractions in Rutland County, Vermont
Festivals established in 1846